Froelichia floridana is a species of flowering plant in the genus Froelichia, in the amaranth family (Amaranthaceae). It is known as  prairie cottonweed, Florida snakecotton, large cottonweed, field snakecotton, or plains snakecotton. The narrowly oblanceolate to elliptic leaves are opposite, occurring on the lower third of the stem. It grows in central and eastern North America, from the Great Plains to Mexico, east to the Atlantic Coast. Its propensity to spread easily has resulted in it being considered an agricultural weed and it is an invasive species in Australia.

References

floridana
Flora of North America